Maximum Force is a  light gun shooter arcade game developed by Mesa Logic for Atari Games in 1997. In 1998, Atari Games re-released the game as part of one machine called Area 51/Maximum Force Duo that also included Area 51, and later ported the game to both the Sony PlayStation and Sega Saturn game consoles.

Like its predecessor Area 51, Maximum Force uses digitized video stored on an on-board hard disk, and red gibs into which every enemy blows apart when shot, in exactly the same way. While enemies, innocents, and explosions are 2D digitized video sprites, the levels and vehicles are pre-rendered in 3D.

Released into markets increasingly dominated by games with polygon graphics, Maximum Force was a critical failure, with many citing generic and dated gameplay, unrealistic death animations, and short length, but a commercial success.

Gameplay
Players are assigned this role of this player character  and main character that’s an unnamed anti-terrorism and counterinsurgency special agent and spy hitman engaging in three of these major combat zones: a freight liner at a dock, a large bank, and a jungle. The first two zones can be played in any order. And these levels are areas under siege by terrorism and players must defeat them before they do to players and cause many victims to suffer. Shooting at hostages or getting shot by these terrorism hitmen causes players to lack a number of chances. After four hits are eliminated, (which is this health bar of players) players must refill credits or else game over. And a level has a maximum of seven chances in the home console versions of this game.

There are several power-ups in this game, such as rapid-fire mode (which is indicated by a spinning assault rifle bullet) for the player's gun or a powerful single-shot mode (which is indicated by a spinning shotgun shell). Shooting windows, barrels, vehicle, and other objects increases player's scores.

Development

The game made its world debut on January 21, 1997 at the Amusement Trades Exhibition International show in London.

Reception

Maximum Force was a moderate success in arcades.

Reviewing the arcade version, Next Generation said that the game "puts a new face on the same old game, and while it's tempting to say that it gets away with it, in the end, it really just doesn't."

The home console versions also met with mediocre reviews. Critics overwhelmingly remarked that digitized light gun shooting was overfamiliar or even outdated, though some added that Maximum Force was superior to most games in that style, including Area 51. In particular, they praised the sound effects and the smoothly animated video with natural-feeling transitions between locations. Sega Saturn Magazine elaborated, "The video backgrounds move very smoothly, and the baddies actually seem to fit in with the rest of the graphics, rather than looking as if they've been stuck in as an afterthought. The only problem with having this graphics system is the way the enemies are killed - the big splodge of red cartoon blood ..."

However, many critics also remarked that the 30-minute length, while decent by arcade standards, was unacceptably short for a home console game, and that the lack of alternate routes to choose from leaves Maximum Force with little replay value. Most reviews assessed the game as overall bland compared to the alternatives, with IGN stating that "Maximum Force isn't as bad as Revolution X or some of the other ones floating around, but it's no Time Crisis either." Game Informer was more positive, describing it as a fun and replayable game which had been converted faithfully to both the PlayStation and the Saturn, but likewise concluded that it was outshone by competitors like Time Crisis. Jeff Gerstmann commented in GameSpot that it "simply falls short. Gamers will be better served by picking up Virtua Cop 2 or even Die Hard Trilogy." Shawn Smith of Electronic Gaming Monthly summarized, "I suppose if you take this game for what it is (a standard B-movie type gun game), then it's not half bad. But if you're looking for something more serious, along the lines of a Virtua Cop 2, then you shouldn't even consider it." GamePro concluded, "Gamers who enjoyed all those gun games of the past will find familiar ground in Maximum Force. However, if you're looking for a real evolutionary step in this genre, you'll have to keep looking."

See also

Target: Terror

Notes

References

External links
 
 

1997 video games
Arcade video games
Atari arcade games
Midway video games
Light gun games
PlayStation (console) games
Rail shooters
Sega Saturn games
Windows games
Video games about terrorism
Video games developed in the United States
Video games with digitized sprites
Video games with pre-rendered 3D graphics
Cooperative video games
Tantalus Media games
Multiplayer and single-player video games